Ellesse Jordan Gundersen (née Tzinberg; born 17 December 1991 in Kuala Lumpur, Malaysia) is a Filipino equestrian athlete. She competed at the 2018 World Equestrian Games and at the 2018 World Cup Final aboard her horse Triviant. She became the first Filipino athlete to compete at the major dressage championships.

Biography
Ellesse Gundersen is born to an American-Australian father and a Filipino-Spanish mother. She started riding at an age of six, and competed already aged 12 in both dressage and show jumping. In 2008, she moved to the United States, where she started an equestrian scholarship at the Kansas State University. In 2009, she received her university degree at the University of San Diego. Her international equestrian career started at the age of 23 in Europe.

Personal life
Ellesse Gundersen is married to Henrik Gundersen and is the mother of a son Christian. They live in Wellington, Florida. She is fluent in English, Filipino, French, Malay and Danish.

Modelling
In 2010, she was scouted as a model while she visited Paris. She was offered a modelling contract to work as a professional. After working a full season as a model, she signed a contract for a modelling agency based in Los Angeles. After four years of modelling, she decided to return to the equestrian world to focus on her professional equestrian career.

Dressage results

World Championships

World Cup

Final

References

External links
 

1991 births
Living people
Filipino female equestrians
Filipino dressage riders
People from Kuala Lumpur
Filipino expatriates in the United States
Filipino people of American descent
Filipino people of Australian descent
Filipino people of Spanish descent